Prayer (stylized as PRAҰER) is the debut studio album by German DJ and record producer Robin Schulz, it was released on 19 September 2014. The album includes the singles "Waves (Robin Schulz Remix)", "Prayer in C (Robin Schulz Remix)", "Willst Du" and "Sun Goes Down".

Singles
 "Waves (Robin Schulz Remix)" (Mr. Probz) was released as the first single from the album on 4 February 2014. The original was released by Mr. Probz on 22 November 2013. The song was remixed by Robin Schulz. The song topped the charts in Austria, Germany, Hungary, Norway, Sweden, Switzerland and the United Kingdom and also reached the top ten in Canada, Denmark, Finland, France, Ireland, Italy and Spain.
 "Prayer in C (Robin Schulz Remix)" (Lilly Wood and the Prick) was released as the second single from the album on 6 June 2014. He released the song with Lilly Wood and the Prick. The song topped the charts in Austria, Belgium, Denmark, Finland, France, Germany, Ireland, the Netherlands, Norway, Spain, Sweden, Switzerland and the United Kingdom.
 "Willst Du" was released as the third single from the album on 22 August 2014. The song has charted in Austria, Germany and Switzerland.
 "Sun Goes Down" was released as the fourth single from the album on 24 October 2014. The song features vocals from British singer Jasmine Thompson. The song peaked at number two in Germany and number three in Austria and Switzerland. The song has also charted in Australia, Belgium, Finland, France, Spain and Sweden.

Track listing

Notes
"Snowflakes" contains a sample of "Snowflakes" by White Apple Tree.
 signifies a remixer
 signifies a vocal producer

Charts

Weekly charts

Year-end charts

Certifications

Release history

References

2014 debut albums
Robin Schulz albums